Bangladesh Medical Research Council is an autonomous national research body that carries out research on medical and health sciences and plans and prioritize research in Bangladesh and is located in Mohakhali, Dhaka, Bangladesh. Prof. Syed Modasser Ali is the current chairman of the executive committee

History
Bangladesh Medical Research Council was established in 1972 under the orders of the president of Bangladesh. It functions under the Ministry of Health and Family Welfare. It publishes a quarterly journal called the Research Information and Communication on Health.

References

Medical research institutes in Bangladesh
Government agencies of Bangladesh
1972 establishments in Bangladesh
Medical research in Asia
Organisations based in Dhaka